David Bakewell Burrell  (born 1 March 1933), a priest of the Congregation of Holy Cross, is an American educator, theologian, writer and translator. He is the Theodore Hesburgh Professor emeritus in Philosophy and Theology at University of Notre Dame, US. He wrote around thirteen books on Judeo-Christian and Islamic religions. He knows several languages; he translated two books of Al-Ghazali from Arabic into English. He also taught comparative theology, ethics and development at Uganda Martyrs University, Nkozi, Uganda; Tangaza College, Nairobi, Kenya; and Hebrew University, Jerusalem. During 1960s, he was involved in Anti-Vietnam War Movement. He is also a professor at Notre Dame University Bangladesh.

Bibliography

Books

Translations
 Al-Ghazali on the Ninety-Nine Beautiful Names of God (translation from Arabic with Nazih Daher) (Cambridge: Islamic Texts Society, 1992; Louisville, KY:  Fons Vitae, 1998)
 Al-Ghazali on Faith in Divine Unity and Trust in Divine Providence (translation of Bk. 35 of Ihya' Ulum ad-Din) (Louisville, KY:  Fons Vitae, 2000)
 Roger Arnaldez's Three Messengers for one God (Notre Dame, IN: University of Notre Dame Press, 1998) – with Mary Louise Gude, C.S.C. and Gerald Schlabach
 Avital Wohlman's Al-Ghazali, Averroes and the Interpretation of the Qur'an:  Common Sense and Philosophy in Islam (London:  Routledge, 2009) – translated from Contrepoint entre le sens commun et la philosophy en Islam: Ghazali et Averroès (Paris: Editions du Cerf, 2008)

References

American Roman Catholic priests
Yale University alumni
University of Notre Dame alumni
University of Notre Dame faculty
1933 births
Congregation of Holy Cross
Living people
Writers from Akron, Ohio
Scholars of medieval philosophy
American medievalists
Arabic–English translators
Academic staff of the Hebrew University of Jerusalem
Pontifical Gregorian University alumni
20th-century American Roman Catholic theologians
21st-century American Roman Catholic theologians
20th-century American philosophers
21st-century American philosophers
20th-century American non-fiction writers
21st-century American non-fiction writers
Catholics from Ohio
Historians from Ohio